Eungbongsan is a mountain in the city of Wonju, Gangwon-do, in South Korea.

See also
 Chiaksan National Park
List of mountains in Korea

Notes

References

Mountains of Gangwon Province, South Korea
Wonju
Yeongwol County
Mountains of South Korea
One-thousanders of South Korea